The 1969–70 season was the 39th completed season of the National Hurling League.

Division 1

Cork came into the season as defending champions of the 1968-69 season.

On 20 September 1970, Cork won the title following a 5-21 to 6-16 aggregate win over New York in the final. It was their second league title in succession and their eighth National League title overall.

Limerick's Richie Bennis was the Division 1 top scorer with 3-36.

Division 1A table

Group stage

Division 1B table

Group stage

Play-off

Knock-out stage

Semi-finals

Home final

Finals

Scoring statistics

Top scorers overall

Top scorers in a single game

Division 2

Kildare came into the season as defending champions of the 1968-69 season.

On 10 May 1970, Antrim won the title following a 2-13 to 3-8 win over Kildare in the final. It was their first league title since 1967-68.

Division 2A table

Division 2B table

Division 2C table

Play-off

Knock-out stage

Semi-final

Final

Division 3

Louth came into the season as defending champions of the 1968-69 season.

Louth won the title following a 2-3 to 1-4 win over Sligo in the final. It was their fourth league title in succession.

Division 3A table

Division 3B table

Knock-out stage

Final

References

National Hurling League seasons
Lea
Lea